Tommie Lindström (1 March 1938 – 21 December 2020) was a Swedish swimmer. He competed in the men's 200 metre breaststroke at the 1960 Summer Olympics.

References

External links
 

1938 births
2020 deaths
Olympic swimmers of Sweden
Swimmers at the 1960 Summer Olympics
Swimmers from Stockholm
Swedish male breaststroke swimmers